Morné Melvin Mellett is a former South African rugby union player, that played with the  provincial team between 2010 and 2014 and with the  Super Rugby team between 2013 and 2015. His usual position is prop.

Career

He retired in December 2015, aged just 26, on medical advice after he suffered a vertebral artery dissection earlier in the year.

References

South African rugby union players
Living people
1989 births
Bulls (rugby union) players
Blue Bulls players
People from Boksburg
Rugby union props
South Africa Under-20 international rugby union players
Rugby union players from Gauteng